The Pius XI Medal is an award presented every second year by the Pontifical Academy of Sciences to a promising scientist under the age of 45.

Winners of the Pius XI Medal (1939-2020)
 1939 Corneille Heymans (Belgium) Physiology 
 1942 Harlow Shapley (United States)  Astronomy
 1943 Emmanuel de Margerie (France) Geography
 1962 Bengt E. Andersson (Sweden) Life Sciences
 1963 Aage Bohr (Denmark) Physics
 1964 François Gros (France) Life Sciences
 1966 Allan Sandage (USA) Astronomy
 1969 Robert Burns Woodward (USA) Chemistry
 1970 Haruo Kanatani (Japan) Life Sciences
 1972 György Némethy (Hungary) Physics
 1975 Stephen W. Hawking (UK) Astronomy
 1976 Lucio Luzzatto (Italy) Life Sciences
 1979 Antonio Paes de Carvalho (Brazil) Life Sciences
 1981 Jean-Marie Lehn (France) Chemistry
 1983 Gerardus t'Hooft (Netherlands) Physics
 1986 Elizabeth A. Bernays (Australia) Life Sciences
 1988 Luis Caffarelli (Argentina) Mathematics
 1992 Adi Shamir (Israel) Other Disciplines
 1996 Mark M. Davis (USA) Chemistry
 2000 Gillian P. Bates (UK) Life Sciences
 2000 Stephen W. Davies (UK) Life Sciences
 2002 Stanislas Dehaene (France) Life Sciences
 2002 Juan M. Maldacena (USA) Physics
 2004 Laure Saint-Raymond (France) Mathematics
 2006 Ashoke Sen (India) Physics
 2008 Juan A. Larraín (Chile) Life Sciences
 2010 Patrick Mehlen (France) Biology
 2012 Trees-Juen Chuang (Taiwan) Genomics
 2012 Ulrich Pöschl (Austria) Chemistry
 2014 Cédric Villani (France) Mathematics
 2016 Mariano Sigman (Argentina) Neurosciences
 2018  Noble Ephraim Banadda (Uganda), David M. Sabatini (USA) and Miriam Serena Vitiello (Italia)
 2020 Demis Hassabis (UK) Computer Science, Peter Scholze (Germany) Mathematics

References

External links
 Home page of the Pontifical Academy of Sciences

Pontifical Academy of Sciences